Adjutor A. Ferguson (May 7, 1927 – July 28, 2004) was a Canadian politician. He served in the Legislative Assembly of New Brunswick from 1967 to 1978 as member of the Liberal party.

References

1927 births
2004 deaths